The 1973 Army Cadets football team represented the United States Military Academy in the 1973 NCAA Division I football season. In their eighth and final year under head coach Tom Cahill, the Cadets compiled an 0–10 record and were outscored by their opponents by a combined total of 382 to 67.  In the annual Army–Navy Game, the Cadets lost to the Midshipmen by a 53 to 0 score and also lost to Notre Dame by a 62 to 3 score. 
 
No Army players were selected as first-team players on the 1973 College Football All-America Team.

Schedule

Personnel

References

Army
Army Black Knights football seasons
College football winless seasons
Army Cadets football